Gleb Pavlovich Yakunin (4 March 1936 – 25 December 2014) was a Russian priest and dissident, who fought for the principle of freedom of conscience in the Soviet Union. He was a member of the Moscow Helsinki Group, and was elected member of the Supreme Soviet of Russia and State Duma from 1990 to 1995.

Biography

Gleb Pavlovich Yakunin was born into a musical family. He studied biology at Irkutsk Agricultural Institute. He converted from atheism to Eastern Orthodox Christianity at the end of the 1950s, after coming into contact with Alexander Men, and graduated from the Moscow Theological Seminary of the Russian Orthodox Church in 1959. In August 1962 he was ordained a priest and was appointed to the parish church in the city of Dmitrov, near Moscow.

Together with the priest Nikolai Eschliman, Yakunin wrote an open letter in 1965 to the Patriarch of Moscow, Alexius I, where he argued that the Church must be liberated from the total control of the Soviet state. The letter was published as a samizdat ("self-published", i.e., underground press). In retaliation for this, he was forbidden to continue his priestly ministry in the parish in May 1966. Aleksandr Solzhenitsyn supported Gleb Yakunin and Nikolai Eschliman in his letter to Patriarch Alexius.

In 1976 he created the Christian Committee for the Defense of the Rights of Believers in the USSR. He published several hundreds of articles about the suppression of religious freedom in the Soviet Union. These documents were used by dissidents of all religious denominations. Yakunin was arrested and convicted for anti-Soviet agitation on 28 August 1980. He was kept in the KGB Lefortovo prison until 1985, and then in a labor camp known as "Perm 37". Later, he was punished by involuntary settlement in the Yakut Autonomous Soviet Socialist Republic.

Gleb Yakunin was given amnesty in March 1987 under Mikhail Gorbachev. He was allowed to return to Moscow and worked again as a priest until 1992.  He was rehabilitated in 1991. In 1990 Yakunin was elected to the Supreme Soviet of the Russian Federation and worked as deputy chairman the Parliamentary Committee for the Freedom of Conscience.  He was co-author of the law concerning "freedom of all denominations" that was used for the opening of churches and monasteries throughout the country.

Gleb Yakunin was a member of the committee created for the investigation of the Soviet coup attempt of 1991 and chaired by Lev Ponomaryov, and thereby gained the access to secret KGB archives. In March 1992 he published materials about the cooperation between the Moscow Patriarchate and the KGB. He published code names of several KGB agents who held high-rank positions in the Russian Orthodox Church including Patriarch Alexius II, Metropolitans Filaret of Kyiv, Pitrim of Volokolamsk, and others. The Russian Orthodox Church defrocked Yakunin in 1993.

Gleb Yakunin was one of the organizers of the Democratic Choice of Russia political alliance in 1993, prior to the opening of the Constituent Assembly of Russia called by the Russian president Boris Yeltsin. He became a State Duma delegate representing the party "Democratic Russia" in 1996. He created the Committee for Defense of Freedom of Conscience in 1995. He criticized the law "On Freedom of Conscience and Religious Associations" adopted by the Duma and made numerous statements in support of human rights in Russia.

As is traditional for Orthodox parish priests, Gleb Yakunin was married, and had three children: Maria, Alexander and Anna.

He died at the age of 80 after a long illness on 25 December 2014.

Writings

Books

Articles and interviews

See also
 Persecution of Christians in the Soviet Union
 Human rights in the Soviet Union

References

External links

His writings 
 Biography and photo album of Gleb Yakunin 
 Interview with Portal-Credo.ru 
 Declaration on the church rights of Orthodox Communities and Eparchies

Russian Orthodox Church
 Christopher Andrew and Vasili Mitrokhin, "The Sword and the Shield", Chapter 28, The Penetration and Persecution of the Soviet Churches, 1999
  Russia: the Orthodox Church and the Kremlin's New Mission - by Victor Yasmann, RFE/RL, April 10, 2006.
  Russia: Introduction of Religious Curriculum Studied, RFE/RL, September 7, 2006
 Letter by David Satter
 The Battle for the Russian Orthodox Church - by Vladimir Moss
 The Orthodox Church at the End of the Millenium, 1990-2000 by Vladimir Moss
 The Betrayal of the Church - by Edmund W. Robb and Julia Robb, 1986
 The Yakunin vs. Dvorkin Trial and the Emerging Religious Pluralism in Russia - by Marat S. Shterin and James T. Richardson
 "U.S. Food Aid Through Patriarchate May Be Abused, Priest Says; Distributor Tied to Illegal Activity & Trafficking in Parts of Unborn Babies" - by Russia Reform Monitor No. 584, February 11, 1999

Other
 Yakov Krotov and his library
 G.Yakunin. Religion and Human Rights. Letters from Moscow 

1936 births
2014 deaths
Clergy from Moscow
People excommunicated by the Russian Orthodox Church
Russian political activists
Russian Eastern Orthodox priests
First convocation members of the State Duma (Russian Federation)
Soviet dissidents
Soviet rehabilitations
Russian human rights activists
Moscow Helsinki Group
21st-century Eastern Orthodox priests
20th-century Eastern Orthodox priests